Zenone Veronese (Zeno da Verona) (1484 – 1542) was an Italian painter of the Renaissance period. He is different but a near-contemporary of Michele da Verona (1470 -1536/1544).

Biography
He was born in Verona, and died as late as 1552-54 by some accounts. He worked in Sala in the Ticino on Lago di Garda, in Rimini (1521), and possibly in Rome. He was influenced by Giovanni Francesco Caroto and Girolamo dai Libri, later by Palma Vecchio, il Romanino, and Giovanni Cariani. He recalls Niccolo Giolfino in his style.

References

External links
Italian Paintings: North Italian School, a collection catalog containing information about Veronese and his works (see pages: 68–69).

15th-century Italian painters
Italian male painters
16th-century Italian painters
Painters from Verona
Renaissance painters
1484 births
1542 deaths